B roads are numbered routes in Great Britain of lesser importance than A roads. See the article Great Britain road numbering scheme for the rationale behind the numbers allocated.

Zone 8 (3 digits)

Zone 8 (4 digits)

See also
 A roads in Zone 8 of the Great Britain numbering scheme
 List of motorways in the United Kingdom
 Transport in Glasgow#Other Roads
 Transport in Scotland#Road

References

8